Wilfrid Nelson Isaac (30 March 1893–15 June 1972) was a New Zealand jeweller, enameller, metalworker and art school director. He is known for several public commissions for silver pieces, such as important trophies, and ecclesiastical items. Trained in the Arts and Crafts movement, he often incorporated New Zealand's indigenous styles, elements and materials such as Maori and opals. He was born in Kyneton, Victoria, Australia.

References

1893 births
1972 deaths
20th-century enamellers
Australian enamellers
New Zealand enamellers
New Zealand jewellers
20th-century New Zealand artists
Metalworkers
New Zealand art teachers
People from Kyneton
Australian emigrants to New Zealand
Australian jewellers
Nelson College faculty
20th-century ceramists
20th-century New Zealand male artists